Franklin Hinchey House is a historic home located at Gates in Monroe County, New York. It is a -story wood-frame cruciform structure constructed in 1870 in the Gothic Revival style with picturesque Italianate elements.  The property includes three acres of farmland, cabbage barn, and incubator house.

It was listed on the National Register of Historic Places in 1983.

References

External links
 History of the Hinchey Homestead from the Gates Historical Society

Houses on the National Register of Historic Places in New York (state)
Gothic Revival architecture in New York (state)
Houses completed in 1870
Houses in Monroe County, New York
National Register of Historic Places in Monroe County, New York